Blina Shale is a fossil bearing geological formation located in the Kimberley region of Northwest Australia.
The location is rich in deposits of vertebrate material, and the site of previously unknown Triassic species. Flora and invertebrate species have also been identified in the deposits, including microplankton and microflora.

Description 
The site is located near Derby, Western Australia. The upper parts of the bed are finer layers sediments; these are evident in some ridges of the Erskine range.
As with the Kockatea Shale in the same region, the bed was formed by deposition in marine environs and at river deltas and estuaries.  The palaeontological significance of the area was recognised in a geological survey of a region known a Fitzroy Trough in 1953, and examination by Brunnschweiler in 1954 determined the age to be Triassic and associated with the Erskine formation. 
The earliest collections were forwarded to R. A. Stirton in the eastern states, and then to the United States for closer analysis.

The first extensive survey was undertaken by a collaboration between the University of California,  represented by C. L. Camp and his undergraduate John Cosgriff, and the Western Australian Museum and University team of David Ride, Duncan Merrilees and K. G. McKenzie. The discoveries included the first early Triassic taxa to be found on the Australian continent.

Fossil content 
Discoveries at the site include the species Batrachosuchus henwoodi and Deltasaurus kimberleyensis, the larger Erythrobatrachus noonkanbahensis, along with previously described Temnospondyli taxa. Other new species and fossil material includes a coelacanth, lungfish species, shark teeth and an actinopterygian species of Saurichthys.

References 

Geologic formations of Australia
Triassic Australia
Induan Stage
Shale formations
Deltaic deposits
Paleontology in Australia
Geology of Western Australia